Acraea wigginsi, the Wiggins' acraea, is a butterfly in the family Nymphalidae which is native to tropical Africa.

Range
It is found in Cameroon, the Democratic Republic of the Congo, Uganda and Kenya.

Description

A. wigginsi Neave. Forewing above blackish at the costal margin, in the apical part and at the distal margin, with a broad white subapical band in cellules 3 to 6, 9 and 10 and often also with yellow marginal spots; the cell and cellules 1a to 2 red-yellow as far as the marginal band; a black dot in the cell and a transverse spot at its apex and also discal dots in 1b to 5 or at least in 1b to 3; hindwing above golden yellow with narrow, yellow-spotted marginal band; forewing beneath as above, but lighter and at the distal margin grey with black veins; hindwing beneath light yellow with narrow white-spotted marginal band, which is proximally accompanied by gold-yellow quadrate spots, and between the discal and basal dots with an irregularly broken red transverse band, in addition with a red spot at the base of cellules 1c and 8. The female only differs in having the red-yellow colour on the forewing above less extended. Expanse 46 to 56 mm. British East Africa and Uganda.

Subspecies
Acraea wigginsi wigginsi — Democratic Republic of the Congo: Ituri, Uganda, western Kenya
Acraea wigginsi occidentalis Bethune-Baker, 1926 — Cameroon

Biology
The habitat consists of grassy edges of sub-montane forests at altitudes above 1,500 meters.

The larvae feed on Cassia zambesiacus and Kotschya strigosa.

Taxonomy
It is a member of the Acraea rahira species group – but see also Pierre & Bernaud, 2014.

References

Butterflies described in 1904
wigginsi